Schuetzen Park can refer to:

Schuetzen Park (Iowa) in Davenport
Schuetzen Park (New Jersey) in North Bergen